Pandit Vishnu Narayan Bhatkhande (10 August 1860 – 19 September 1936) was an Indian musicologist who wrote the first modern treatise on Hindustani classical music, an art which had been propagated for centuries mostly through oral traditions. During those earlier times, the art had undergone several changes, rendering the raga grammar documented in scant old outdated texts.

Ragas used to be classified into Raga (male), Ragini (female), and Putra (children). Bhatkhande reclassified them into the currently used thaat system. He noted that several ragas did not conform to their description in ancient Sanskrit texts. He explained the ragas in an easy-to-understand language and composed several bandishes which explained the grammar of the ragas.

Early life
Pandit Vishnu Narayan Bhatkhande was born on 10 August 1860 in Walkeshwar,  Bombay. While not a professional musician himself, his father, who worked for an affluent businessman, ensured that Vishnu Narayan and his siblings received an education in classical music. After turning fifteen, Bhatkhande became a student of the sitar and subsequently began studying Sanskrit texts that dealt with music theory. He completed a BA degree at Deccan College in Pune in 1885. In 1887, Bhatkhande graduated with a degree in law from Elphinstone College, Bombay University and briefly pursued a career in criminal law.

In 1884, Bhatkhande became a member of Gayan Uttejak Mandali, a music appreciation society in Bombay, which broadened his experience with music performance and teaching. He studied at the Mandali for six years and learned a variety of compositions in both khayal and dhrupad forms under musicians such as Shri Raojibua Belbagkar and Ustad Ali Hussain. Music was still something of a leisurely pursuit for Bhatkhande until 1900 when his wife died, followed, in 1903, by the death of his daughter. This led to him abandoning his law practice and devoting his full attention to music.

Career

Research in music
Bhatkhande traveled throughout India, meeting with ustads and pandits, and researching music. He began the study of ancient texts such as the Natya Shastra and Sangeet Ratnakara.

After the death of his wife and his daughter, Bhatkhande abandoned his legal practice and devoted the rest of his life to systematising the prevailing forms of Hindustani music and building on that system a coordinated theory and practice of music. During his travels in India, he spent time in the then princely states of Baroda, Gwalior, and Rampur. In Rampur he was the disciple of legendary veena Player Ustad Wazir Khan, a descendant of Miyan Tansen.

Bhatkhande travelled to South India, arriving in Madras (now Chennai) in 1904. With the help of local contacts he began to familiarise himself with the world of Carnatic music. He established contact with stalwarts such as Thiruvottiyur Tyagier and Tachur Singaracharya in Madras, Poochi Srinivasa Iyengar in Ramanathapuram and Subbarama Dikshitar in Ettayapuram but the language barrier made these interactions less fruitful than he expected. Notes from a journal maintained of his time there were later published as Meri Dakshin Bharat Ki Sangeet Yatra (My Musical Journey in Southern India).

While his conversations with exponents of Carnatic music weren't very successful, Bhatkhande procured two valuable manuscripts on the art: the Chaturdandiprakashika by Venkatamakhin and the Svaramelakalanidhi of Ramamatya, both treatises that sought to classify ragas. The two works along with others and his observations from his travels in North India enabled Bhatkhande to classify Hindustani ragas using a system of ten, much like the melakartas of the Carnatic style.

Bhatkhande's first published work, Swar Malika, was a  booklet containing detailed descriptions of all prevalent ragas. In 1909, he published Shri Mallakshaya Sangeetam, in Sanskrit, under the pseudonym 'Chatur-pandit'. To make this cultural heritage accessible to the common man, he published commentary on his own Sanskrit grantha in Marathi  over a span of several years; it was published over four volumes bearing the title: Hindustani Sangeet Paddhati. These volumes form today the standard text on Hindustani music, an indispensable starting point for any student of Hindustani Classical Music. His disciple S N Ratanjankar, famous musician Shri. Dilip Kumar Roy, Ratanjankar's disciple K. G. Ginde, S.C.R. Bhatt, Ram Ashrey Jha 'Ramrang', Sumati Mutatkar and Krishna Kumar Kapoor are among the notable scholars who followed in the footsteps of Bhatkhande. His notation system became standard and though later scholars like Pandit V. D. Paluskar, Pandit Vinayakrao Patwardhan and Pandit Omkarnath Thakur introduced their improved versions, it remained a publisher's favorite. It suffered a setback with the onset of desktop publishing, which found inserting marks above and below Devanagari text cumbersome; as a result, books carrying compositions yielded to theoretical texts. A recently developed notation system Ome Swarlipi follows the logical structure introduced by Pt. Bhatkhande but uses symbols instead of Devanagari alphabets.

After traveling widely and having discussions with practitioners of various schools, Bhatkhande arranged all the ragas of Hindustani classical music across 10 musical scales, called thaats. Though the thaats do not encompass all possible ragas, they do cover the vast majority and are a key contribution to Indian musical theory. The thaat structure corresponds to the melakarta system of raga arrangement in Carnatic music, the south Indian variety of Indian classical music.

Bhatkhande wrote all of his works under one of the two pseudonyms, Vishnu Sharma and Chaturpandit.

Institutions

Bhatkhande started schools and colleges in India for systematic teaching of Hindustani music. In 1916, he reorganized the Baroda state music school, and later, with the help of the Maharaja of Gwalior, established the Madhav Music College in Gwalior.

In 1926, Rai Umanath Bali and his nephew Dr. Rai Rajeshwar Bali, then education minister of United Provinces, established Marris College of Music in Lucknow, Bhatkhande preparing the course material. The college was later renamed Bhatkhande College of Hindustani Music, and is now known as Bhatkhande Music Institute (Deemed University). Preparation of that course material was a landmark achievement of Bhatkhande since musical knowledge used to be passed on orally in earlier times from Gurus and Ustads to their disciples.

Bhatkhande prepared the Hindustani Sangeet Kramik Pustak Maalika as a series of textbooks. He also started the tradition of the All India Music Conferences to provide a common platform for discussion between Hindustani and Carnatic classical musicians.

Death
Bhatkhande suffered paralysis and a thigh fracture in 1933. He died on 19 September 1936, during Ganeshotsav in Mumbai.

Bibliography
 Shrimallakshya-sangeetam – A treatise, in Sanskrit, on the theory of music in slokas and describing the important ragas. (Lakshya=current)
 Lakshan Geet Sangrah in three parts. Compositions descriptive of the Ragas, giving their characteristics in songs composed by Pandit Bhatkhande.
 Hindustani Sangeet Paddhati in 4 parts – A commentary on the Lakshya Sangeetam in Marathi. It is a detailed study and discussion of the theory of music and explanation of 150 Ragas of Hindustani music. This important work has been translated into Hindi.
 Kramik Pustak Malika –  This book was published in six parts. It is a detailed textbook of Hindustani music, describing all the important Ragas, their theory and illustrated with well-known compositions in notations. It contains about 1,200 such compositions.
 Swara Malika (in Gujarati characters) Notation of Ragas in swara and tala.
 A Comparative Study of the Music Systems of the 15th, 16th, 17th and 18th Centuries (in English).
 Historical Survey of the Music of India.
 Geet Malika – which was originally published in 23 monthly issues, each containing 25 to 30 classical compositions of Hindustani Sangeet in notation.
 Abhinav Raga Manjari – A treatise on the Ragas of Hindustani music, each being described briefly in one sloka in Sanskrit.
 Abhinav Tala Manjari –  A textbook in Sanskrit on the Talas

Manuscripts edited by Bhatkhande
 Swara Mela Kalanidhi by Ramamatya
 Chaturdandi Prakashika by Venkatamakhin
 Raga Lakshanam
 Raga Tarangini by Lochan
 Raga Tatva Vibodh by Shriniwas
 Sadraga Chandrodaya by Pundarik Vithal
 Raga Manjari by Pundarik Vithal
 "Raga Mala" by Pundarik Vithal
 Nartan Niranaya by Kashinath Shashtri Appa Tulsi
 Sangeet Sudhakar by Kashinath Shashtri Appa Tulsi
 Sangeet Kalp Drumankur by Kashinath Shashtri Appa Tulsi
 Raga Chandrika by Kashinath Shashtri Appa Tulsi
 Raga Chandrika Sar (Hindi)

References

Further reading

External links

 Bhatkhande Sangit Vidyapith
 Excerpts from Bhatkhande's SangeetShastra
 A biography of Bhatkhande

1860 births
1936 deaths
Hindustani singers
Indian musicologists
Indian music educators
Marathi music
19th-century Indian male classical singers
Singers from Mumbai
20th-century Indian male classical singers
Bandish composers